José de Jesús Castillo Rentería, MNM (July 2, 1927 – April 23, 2013) was the Catholic bishop of the Diocese of Tuxtepec, Mexico.

Ordained to the priesthood in 1950, he was named bishop of this diocese in 1979, retiring in 2005.

Notes

1927 births
2013 deaths
20th-century Roman Catholic bishops in Mexico
21st-century Roman Catholic bishops in Mexico